Oreochromis mweruensis is a species of swamp-dwelling cichlid native to the Democratic Republic of the Congo, Rwanda and Zambia.  This species can reach a length of  SL.  This species may have potential as a farmed fish.

References

mweruensis
Freshwater fish of Africa
Fish of the Democratic Republic of the Congo
Fish of Rwanda
Fish of Zambia
Taxonomy articles created by Polbot
Fish described in 1983